Ahmed Muhiddin Piri ( 1465 – 1553), better known as Piri Reis (  or Hacı Ahmet Muhittin Pîrî Bey), was an Ottoman navigator, geographer and cartographer. He is primarily known today for his maps and charts collected in his Kitab-ı Bahriye (Book of Navigation), a book that contains detailed information on early navigational techniques as well as relatively accurate charts for their time, describing the important ports and cities of the Mediterranean Sea.

He gained fame as a cartographer when a small part of his first world map, prepared in 1513, was discovered in 1929 at the Topkapı Palace in Istanbul. His world map is the oldest known Turkish atlas showing the New World, and one of the oldest maps of America still existing anywhere (the oldest known surviving map of America is the map drawn by Juan de la Cosa in 1500). Piri Reis's map is centered on the Sahara at the latitude of the Tropic of Cancer.

In 1528, Piri Reis drew a second world map, of which a small fragment (showing Greenland and North America from Labrador and Newfoundland in the north to Florida, Cuba, Hispaniola, Jamaica and parts of Central America in the south) still survives. According to his imprinting text, he had drawn his maps using about 20 foreign charts and mappae mundi (Arab, Spanish, Portuguese, Chinese, Indian and Greek) including one by Christopher Columbus. He was executed in 1553 in Cairo, having been found guilty of lifting the siege of Hormuz Island and abandoning the fleet, even though his reason for doing so was the lack of maintenance of his ships.

Biography 

Very little background information is known about Piri Reis. Unconfirmed tradition holds that he was born around 1470 in Gallipoli on the Dardanelles which was at the time an important Ottoman naval base. His father was Hacı Mehmed, a Turk originally from the Anatolian province of Karaman. His full name was Hacı Ahmed Muhiddin Piri. Reis was a military rank equivalent to captain, so the name Piri Reis translates as Captain Piri. The honorary and informal Islamic title Hadji (Turkish: Hacı) in Piri's and his father's names indicate that they both had completed the Hajj (Islamic pilgrimage) by going to Mecca during the dedicated annual period.

Piri began engaging in government-supported privateering (a common practice in the Mediterranean Sea among both the Muslim and Christian states of the 15th and 16th centuries) when he was young, following his uncle Kemal Reis, a well-known corsair and seafarer of the time, who later became a famous admiral of the Ottoman Navy. During this period, together with his uncle, he took part in many naval wars of the Ottoman Empire against Spain, the Republic of Genoa and the Republic of Venice, including the First Battle of Lepanto (Battle of Zonchio) in 1499 and the Second Battle of Lepanto (Battle of Modon) in 1500. When his uncle Kemal Reis died in 1511 (his ship was wrecked by a storm in the Mediterranean Sea, while he was heading to Egypt), Piri returned to Gelibolu, where he started working on his studies about navigation.

By 1516, he was again at sea as a ship captain in the Ottoman fleet. He took part in the 1516–17 Ottoman conquest of Egypt. In 1522 he participated in the Siege of Rhodes against the Knights of St. John, which ended with the island's surrender to the Ottomans on 25 December 1522 and the permanent departure of the Knights from Rhodes on 1 January 1523 (the Knights relocated briefly to Sicily and later permanently to Malta). In 1524 he captained the ship that took the Ottoman Grand Vizier Pargalı İbrahim Pasha to Egypt.

In 1547, Piri had risen to the rank of Reis (admiral) as the Commander of the Ottoman Fleet in the Indian Ocean and Admiral of the Fleet in Egypt, headquartered in Suez. On 26 February 1548 he recaptured Aden from the Portuguese, followed in 1552 by the sack of Muscat, which Portugal had occupied since 1507, and the strategically important island of Kish. Turning further east, Piri Reis attempted to capture the island of Hormuz in the Strait of Hormuz, at the entrance of the Persian Gulf, unsuccessfully, the Ottomans managed to capture the city but not the fortress. He then sacked the nearby island of Qeshm and sailed with his booty to Basra. When the Portuguese turned their attention to the Persian Gulf, Piri Reis occupied the Qatar peninsula to deprive the Portuguese of suitable bases on the Arabian coast.

He then returned to Egypt, an old man approaching the age of 90. When he refused to support the Ottoman Vali (Governor) of Basra, Kubad Pasha, in another campaign against the Portuguese in the northern Persian Gulf, Piri Reis was beheaded in 1553.

Several warships and submarines of the Turkish Navy have been named after Piri Reis.

Kitab-ı Bahriye 

Piri Reis is the author of the Kitāb-ı Baḥrīye, or "Book of the Sea", one of the most famous cartographical works of the period. The book gives seafarers information on the Mediterranean coast, islands, crossings, straits, and gulfs; where to take refuge in the event of a storm, how to approach the ports, and precise routes to the ports.

The work was first published in 1521,  and it was revised in 1524–1525 with additional information and better-crafted charts in order to be presented as a gift to Sultan Suleiman I. The revised edition had a total of 434 pages containing 290 maps.

Sources
Although he was not an explorer and never sailed to the Atlantic, he compiled over twenty maps of Arab, Spanish, Portuguese, Chinese, Indian and older Greek origins into a comprehensive representation of the known world of his era. This work included the recently explored shores of both the African and American continents; on his first World Map of 1513, he imprinted the description "these lands and islands are drawn from the map of Columbus." 
In his text, he also wrote that he used the "maps drawn in the time of Alexander the Great" as a source, but most likely he had mistakenly confused the 2nd-century Greek geographer Ptolemy with   Alexander's general of the same name (of four and a half centuries before), since his map is similar with the Jan of Stobnica famous reproduction map of Ptolemy, printed in 1512.
Ptolemy's Geographia had been translated in Turkish after a personal order of Mehmed II some decades before.
It can be seen that the Atlantic part of the map originates with Columbus because of the errors it contains (such as Columbus's belief that Cuba was a continental peninsula) since at the time the manuscript was produced, the Spaniards had already been in Mexico for two years.

Contents

Apart from the maps, the book also contained detailed information on the major ports, bays, gulfs, capes, peninsulas, islands, straits and ideal shelters of the Mediterranean Sea, as well as techniques of navigation and navigation-related information on astronomy, together with information about the local people of each country and city and the curious aspects of their culture. There are thirty legends around the world map, twenty-nine in Turkish and one in Arabic; the latter gives the date as the month Muharrem of AH 919 AH (i.e. the spring of 1513) but most studies have identified the more probable date of completion as 1521. 

The Kitab-ı Bahriye has two main sections, with the first section dedicated to information about the types of storms; techniques of using a compass; portolan charts with detailed information on ports and coastlines; methods of finding direction using the stars; and characteristics of the major oceans and the lands around them. Special emphasis is given to the discoveries in the New World by Christopher Columbus and those of Vasco da Gama and the other Portuguese seamen on their way to India and the rest of Asia.

The second section is entirely composed of portolan charts and cruise guides. Each topic contains the map of an island or coastline. In the first book (1521), this section has a total of 132 portolan charts, while the second book (1525) has a total of 210 portolan charts. The second section starts with the description of the Dardanelles Strait and continues with the islands and coastlines of the Aegean Sea, Ionian Sea, Adriatic Sea, Tyrrhenian Sea, Ligurian Sea, the French Riviera, the Balearic Islands, the coasts of Spain, the Strait of Gibraltar, the Canary Islands, the coasts of North Africa, Egypt and the River Nile, the Levant and the coastline of Anatolia. This section also includes descriptions and drawings of the famous monuments and buildings in every city, as well as biographic information about Piri Reis who also explains the reasons why he preferred to collect these charts in a book instead of drawing a single map, which would not be able to contain so much information and detail.

A century after Piri's death and during the second half of the 17th century, a third version of his book was produced, which left the text of the second version unaffected while enriching the cartographical part of the manuscript. 
It included additional new large-scale maps, mostly copies of the Italian (from Battista Agnese and Jacopo Gastaldi) and Dutch (Abraham Ortelius) works of the previous century. 
These maps were much more accurate and depict the Black Sea, which was not included in the original.

Manuscripts
Copies of the Kitab-ı Bahriye are found in various libraries in Istanbul and in some of the major libraries in Europe, besides one copy known to be held privately in the USA (Walters Art Museum).

Copies of the first edition (1521):
    Istanbul, Topkapı Palace, ms Bagdad 337
    Istanbul, Nuruosmaniye Library, ms 2990
    Istanbul,  Süleymaniye Library, ms Aya Sofya 2605
    Bologna University Library, ms. Marsili 3609.
    Bologna University Library, ms. Marsili 3612.
    Vienna, Austrian National Library, Cod. H.O. 192.
    Dresden, Staatbibliothek, ms. Eb 389.
    Paris, Bibliothèque nationale, suppl.turc 220.
    London, British Museum, ms. Oriental 4131.
    Oxford,  Bodleian Library, MS. D'Orville 543
    Baltimore, Walters Art Museum, W.658.

Copies of the second edition (1525):
    Istanbul,  Topkapı Palace, ms. Hazine 642.
    Istanbul,  Köprülü Library, ms. 171.
    Istanbul,  Süleymaniye Library, ms Aya Sofya 3161.
    Paris, Bibliothèque nationale, suppl. Turc 956.

In popular culture 
Piri Reis is mentioned in the video game Assassin's Creed: Brotherhood, and appears in its sequel Assassin's Creed: Revelations. In Brotherhood, a group of Italian Assassins sent from Rome to Constantinople by Ezio Auditore da Firenze infiltrates Piri Reis's shop to steal some of his maps detailing the New World, in order to match the Templars' expansion into the new lands. By Revelations, despite his earlier conflict with the Assassins, Piri joins the Ottoman Assassin Brotherhood in 1506 to serve as a scholar and technician, and even eventually progresses to the rank of Master Assassin.

In the 2021 Turkish TV series Barbaros: Sword of the Mediterranean, he is portrayed by actor Emir Benderlioglu.

See also 

 Geography and cartography in medieval Islam
 Indian Ocean campaigns
 Ottoman Navy

References

Bibliography

Further reading
Editions of Kitab-ı Bahriye
 
 
 
 

1513 map:
 
 
Reprinted as

External links 
 
 
  
 

 
1460s births
1550s deaths
15th-century explorers
16th-century explorers
Naval history of the Ottoman Empire
People from Gelibolu
Cartographers from the Ottoman Empire
Executed people from the Ottoman Empire
Suleiman the Magnificent
Geographers from the Ottoman Empire
16th-century geographers
15th-century people from the Ottoman Empire
16th-century people from the Ottoman Empire
16th-century executions by the Ottoman Empire
Executed Turkish people
People executed by the Ottoman Empire by decapitation